Olesya Gureeva (uzb: Olesya Gureyeva Cyrillic: Гуреева Олеся born 1980) is a Uzbekistani mass wrestling, powerlifting  strongwoman and bodybuilder. Gureeva is the first female winner of Arnold Sports festivals and Mass Wrestling absolute World Champion 2017, 2018 and 2022 OHIO, Columbus from Central Asia.

Biography 
Gureeva started her strongwoman career in 2012, by participating in the National Championships of Uzbekistan. Her first international tournier was I Mas-Wrestling World Championship that held in Russia. In 2017 and 2018 in a row from 22 participants, 9 countries she won Gold medal of Mas-Wrestling World Absolute Championship, at Arnold Sports Festival in Columbus, Ohio. After 4 years in 2022 she has repeated the same result at  Arnold Classic International MAS Wrestling Championship, in Coolumbus, Ohio and gained Gold of Championships. Gureeva is a 3x (2016, 2019, 2022) silver medalist and 2x bronze medalist (2014, 2018) of World Championships.

Anthropometry 
Height:
Off Season Weight: 85  kg
Competition Weight: 85 kg

Competitions

Family 
Gureeva is married to Pavel Umurzakov and she has two daughters.

See also 
Mas-wrestling

References 

Female bodybuilders
1980 births
Sportspeople from Tashkent
Professional bodybuilders
Uzbekistani sportswomen
Uzbekistani female athletes
Living people
21st-century Uzbekistani women